E-4031 is an experimental class III antiarrhythmic drug that blocks potassium channels of the hERG-type.

Chemistry 
E-4031 is a synthesized toxin that is a methanesulfonanilide class III antiarrhythmic drug.

Target 
E-4031 acts on a specific class of voltage-gated potassium channels mainly found in the heart, the hERG channels. hERG channels (Kv11.1) mediate the IKr current, which repolarizes the myocardial cells. The hERG channel is encoded by ether-a-go-go related gene (hERG).

Mode of action 
E-4031 blocks hERG-type potassium channels  by binding to the open channels. Its structural target within the hERG-channel is unclear, but some other methanesulfonanilide class III antiarrhythmic drugs are known to bind to the S6 domain or C-terminal of the hERG-channel.

Reducing IKr in myocardial cells prolongs the cardiac action potential and thus prolongs the QT-interval. In non-cardiac cells, blocking Ikr has a different effect: it increases the frequency of action potentials.

Toxicity 
As E-4031 can prolong the QT-interval, it can cause lethal arrhythmias.

Therapeutic use 
E-4031 is solely used for research purposes. So far, one clinical trial has been conducted to test the effect of E-4031 on prolongation of the QT-interval.

References

HERG blocker
Potassium channel blockers
Pyridines
Piperidines
Aromatic ketones
Sulfonamides